Mohammad Najam Yahya (born 1924) was an Afghan field hockey player who competed at the 1956 Summer Olympic Games. He played in all three of his team's matches and scored one goal.

References

External links
 

Field hockey players at the 1956 Summer Olympics
Olympic field hockey players of Afghanistan
Afghan male field hockey players
Possibly living people
1924 births